Harold Gosney is an artist and sculptor. Many of Gosney's commissioned works are in the public domain; notably at York Art Gallery and on permanent display in Ripon, York and
Chester cathedrals.

Career 

Gosney became a student at Grimsby School of Art in 1954. He completed their Foundation course with such success that, two years later, he was offered a place at the prestigious Slade School of Fine Art.
He won several prizes whilst studying at the Slade, eventually specialising in theatre design.

In 1960, Gosney returned to teach at the Grimsby School of Art. He became deeply interested in sculpture from this point onwards.

Gosney has worked in wood and copper with favourite themes being birds, horses and the female form.
He developed a unique technique for working with sheet metal in three dimensions, exemplified by the life-size Horse and Rider, now permanently on display at Normanby Hall in North Lincolnshire.

The majority of Gosney's early commissions were collaborations with architects and he has made a significant contribution to public art in Grimsby.
He is the artist responsible for the reliefs on the Abbey Walk car park,
the large Grimsby seal by the entrance to the Grimsby Central Library
and the Grim and Havelok themed copper relief on the side of Wilko store in Old Market Place.

Gosney retired from teaching in 1992 and moved to York to concentrate on sculpture.

As a rule, Gosney does not sell his work, but to celebrate his 80th birthday and retrospective exhibition, he offered two lots for auction, with all proceeds being donated to the Stained Glass Trust in York.

Themes 

Gosney's work is often inspired by classical and Renaissance art and themes drawn from ancient and modern mythologies.
The human form and the horse dominate his subject matter and can be seen in many of his intriguing and remarkable sculptures and the beautifully
executed drawings which he makes when first planning commissions.

The artist has explained how his approach has changed over the years: "My first sculptures in the early 60's were in stone and were
considerably inspired by the work of Henry Moore. When I experimented, first with cold cast metal and later with welding in steel and
copper, I carried out a number of abstract pieces. However, I soon needed a different challenge and returned to work that was derived from
observation and drawing, mostly inspired by human and animal forms. My work, whilst not overtly realistic, aims to consider the essence of
the subject."

Awards 

 Gosney was awarded the Slade School of Art drawing prize as a student.

References

20th-century British sculptors
21st-century sculptors
English male sculptors
English contemporary artists
1937 births
Living people